NGC 5806 is an intermediate spiral galaxy in the constellation Virgo. It was discovered on February 24, 1786, by the astronomer John Herschel. It is located about 70 million light-years (or about 21 Megaparsecs) away from the Milky Way. It is a member of the NGC 5846 Group.

NGC 5806 contains a star that was catalogued as a supernova (SN Hunt 248), but turned out to be a supernova imposter. The progenitor was detected as a cool hypergiant with an absolute visual magnitude of −9 and 400,000 times more luminous than the sun.

NGC 5806 has also hosted several true supernova. SN 2004dg, around 100 times brighter than SN Hunt 248 was a typical type II supernova.  The progenitor has not been detected and is expected to have been a relatively low mass, low luminosity, red supergiant. PTF12os in 2012 was a type IIb supernova that occurred in 2012, and iPTF13bvn was a type Ib supernova that exploded in 2013.

References

External links

An LBV masquerading as a cool hypergiant
ESA/Hubble Picture of the Week showing SN 2004dg

Intermediate spiral galaxies
Virgo (constellation)
5806